Brunswick Corporation, formerly known as the Brunswick-Balke-Collender Company, is an American corporation that has been developing, manufacturing and marketing a wide variety of products since 1845. Today, Brunswick has more than 13,000 employees operating in 24 countries. Brunswick owns major boating brands, including Sea Ray, Boston Whaler, Bayliner, Mercury Marine, Attwood, Lund, Crestliner, Mastervolt, MotorGuide, Harris Pontoons, Freedom Boat Club, Princecraft, Heyday, Lowe, Uttern, Quicksilver and CZone, among many others. In 2021, Brunswick reported sales of US$5.8 billion. Brunswick's global headquarters is in the northern Chicago suburb of Mettawa, Illinois. On October 4, 2021, Brunswick Corporation announced that it has completed its acquisition of Navico, a global leader in marine electronics and sensors for $1.05 billion, adding to Brunswick the industry leading Navico brands of Lowrance, Simrad, B&G, and C-MAP.

History

Brunswick was founded by John Moses Brunswick who came to the United States from Switzerland at the age of 15. The J. M. Brunswick Manufacturing Company opened for business on September 15, 1845, in Cincinnati, Ohio. Originally J. M. Brunswick intended his company to be mainly in the business of making  carriages, but soon after opening his machine shop, he became fascinated with billiards and decided that making billiard tables would be more lucrative, as the better tables then in use in the United States were imported from England. Brunswick billiard tables were a commercial success, and the business expanded and opened the first of what would become many branch offices in Chicago, Illinois, in 1848. It was later renamed J. M. Brunswick & Brother by 1860, after a family member came on board, and the company's slogan at this time was: "The oldest and most extensive billiard table manufacturers in the United States".

In 1874, the Brunswick company merged with competitor Great Western Billiard Manufactory owned by Julius Balke to become the J. M. Brunswick & Balke Company. It was incorporated in 1879 with a capital stock of $275,000, the same year it merged with another competitor, H. W. Collender Company of New York City (founded by Hugh W. Collender), to acquire Collender's patented billiard cushions. In 1884, the partners formed the Brunswick-Balke-Collender Company (or  Company for short) with capital of $1.5 million.

The company expanded into making a number of other products. Large ornate neo-classical style bars for saloons were a popular product. Bowling balls, pins, and equipment led a growing line of sporting equipment. It popularized bowling balls of manufactured materials, vulcanized rubber at first; earlier bowling balls had been solid wood.

In the early 20th century, Brunswick expanded the product line to include such diverse products as toilet seats, automobile tires, and phonographs. In the late 1910s, they introduced a quickly popular line of disc phonograph records, under the name Brunswick Records. In 1930, Brunswick sold the control of the record company to Warner Brothers and came out with a line of refrigerators.

During World War II, Brunswick-Balke-Collender made small target-drone aircraft for the U.S. military.
After the war, Brunswick introduced a line of school furniture. In 1949, the Brunswick "Model A" Mechanical Pinsetter fully automated unit premiered, for the purpose of handling bowling pins for the sport of tenpins, in competition with American Machine and Foundry (AMF). Previously, Brunswick had made two models of semi-automated, manually operated "spotting tables" for the tenpin sport, that the "Model A" unit replaced. The 1950s also saw the introduction of a line of golfing equipment to compete with AMF in the leisure-products and sporting-goods markets.

The Brunswick-Balke-Collender Company officially changed its name to the Brunswick Corporation on April 10, 1960. The following year the company reported sales of $422 million. Brunswick acquired Mercury Marine in 1961. In the 1970s, Brunswick introduced the automatic scorer, which electronically tallied the score instead of the bowler doing it by hand.

The Brunswick Corporation patented a machine gun using a delayed blowback operation via a fluted chamber as part of the weapon's operation. Another platform was the Rifleman's Assault Weapon, an unusual grenade launcher that used a spherical rocket propelled grenade.

In the 1980s, Brunswick became a major maker of yachts and pleasure boats, under brands including Bayliner, Boston Whaler, Maxum, Sea Ray, and Trophy.

During the Gulf War, Brunswick supplied the military with camouflage nets. They also made radomes for the Patriot missile.

In 1997, Brunswick purchased the Roadmaster bicycle division, one of the last U.S. manufacturers of low-cost, mass-market bicycles.  However, it became apparent that continued U.S. manufacture of such products was not viable in the presence of surging low-priced imports from overseas producers, primarily China. In 1999, Brunswick sold its Roadmaster bicycle division and brand to Pacific Cycle.

In 2001, Brunswick acquired Hatteras Yachts from Genmar Industries for approximately $80 million in cash. Brunswick sold its Hatteras/Cabo brand in 2013 to Versa Capital Management.

Recent events 
As of the early 21st century, the Brunswick Corporation still manufactured sporting and fitness equipment (Life Fitness, Hammer Strength, Parabody) in addition to boats (Sea Ray, Bayliner, Maxum, etc.) and marine engines under the Mercury Marine brand name.

In 2004, Brunswick acquired Lowe Boats. The same year, the company also purchased Northstar Technologies, a leading marine electronics provider based in Acton, Massachusetts, from Canadian Marconi Corporation (now CMC Electronics, a wholly owned subsidiary of Esterline Technologies Corporation).  Brunswick then merged Navman, based in Auckland, New Zealand, with Northstar to make Northstar/Navman a supplier to the Brunswick Boat Groups. Brunswick also acquired Mx-Marine. When George Buckley, CEO at the time, left to join 3M in 2006, new leadership decided to sell Northstar, Navman and Mx-Marine. Navico now owns those three brands in addition to the Eagle, Lowrance, B&G, and Simrad lines.
Brunswick has established regional headquarters in Verviers, Belgium; Monterrey, Mexico; Dandenong, Australia; and Dubai, UAE, to better serve its customers by designing, engineering, manufacturing and distributing products based on local needs, using local talent.

On July 17, 2014, Brunswick announced plans to leave the bowling business by the end of 2014. The company disclosed that it had agreed to sell its bowling center business, which brought in $187 million in revenue in the prior year, to competitor Bowlmor AMF (now known as Bowlero Corporation) for $270 million. It also disclosed that it had retained Lazard to find a buyer for its bowling equipment and products business. The company said it was making these changes to focus on its “core” Marine and Fitness businesses, which provided 92% of company net revenues in 2013. It would retain its heritage billiards business and report billiards financial results as part of the Fitness segment. The sale of the bowling center business to Bowlmor AMF (Bowlero) was completed in September 2014.

Brunswick completed its exit from the bowling business in May 2015 with the sale of its bowling equipment and products division to BlueArc Capital Management, a private investment firm. BlueArc completed the acquisition with investments from Gladstone Investment Corporation, and Capitala Finance Corp. BlueArc continues to produce bowling balls under the Brunswick and DV8 brand names, and on November 15, 2019, it acquired Ebonite International and all of its bowling product brands.

In August 2018, Brunswick Corporation acquired Power Products - Global Marine & Mobile business, which includes the global marine, specialty vehicle, mobile, industrial power, and transportation aftermarket products businesses of Power Products, for $910 million in cash from San Francisco-based private equity firm Genstar Capital.

Also in 2018, the company announced it would be separating the fitness business as Life Fitness Holdings in 2019. In May 2019, Brunswick announced the sale of Brunswick Billiards, Life Fitness, Cybex, Hammer Strength, Indoor Cycling Group, and SCIFIT for $490 million to KPS Capital Partners. The sale was completed in June 2019.

In May 2019, Brunswick announced it would be purchasing the largest marine franchisor in the United States, Freedom Boat Club.

Also in 2019, Brunswick announced a new business structure, Advanced Systems Group (ASG) and named Brett Dibkey as President. ASG is composed of 11 Power Products brands combined with the Attwood Group of businesses including Attwood, Garelick, MotorGuide, and Whale - as well as NAUTIC-ON.

See also 
 Brunswick-Balke Collender Cup

References

External links

 
Companies listed on the New York Stock Exchange
Manufacturing companies established in 1845
Companies based in Lake Forest, Illinois
Sporting goods manufacturers of the United States
Cue sports equipment manufacturers
Ten-pin bowling equipment manufacturers
Conglomerate companies of the United States
1845 establishments in Ohio